Karen Hogan is the current Auditor General of Canada.

Early life and education
Hogan holds both a Bachelor's and a graduate diploma in accounting from Concordia University in Montreal.

Career
Hogan has served in various corporate including with the Montreal office of  Ernst & Young and as a Senior Accounting manager for Canada Post in Ottawa. Hogan is a member of the Chartered Professional Accountants of Ontario as well as the Ordre des comptables professionnels agréés du Québec.

Hogan joined the Office of the Auditor General of Canada in 2006.

Hogan was appointed as Assistant Auditor General of Canada in January 2019. 

In June 2020, she was appointed as Auditor General. Hogan succeeds Sylvain Richard who had been acting in the role since the death of the previous Auditor General  Michael Ferguson in 2019.

References

Year of birth missing (living people)
Living people
Canadian accountants
Canadian auditors
21st-century Canadian civil servants